Bruno De Hesselle (born 9 September 1941) is a Belgian water polo player. He competed at the 1960 Summer Olympics and the 1964 Summer Olympics.

See also
 Belgium men's Olympic water polo team records and statistics
 List of men's Olympic water polo tournament goalkeepers

References

External links
 

1941 births
Living people
Belgian male water polo players
Water polo goalkeepers
Olympic water polo players of Belgium
Water polo players at the 1960 Summer Olympics
Water polo players at the 1964 Summer Olympics
Sportspeople from Antwerp
20th-century Belgian people